Millières may refer to several communes in northern France:

 Millières, Manche, in the Manche département
 Millières, Haute-Marne, in the Haute-Marne département